The House of Branković (Brankovići / Бранковићи) is a Serbian medieval noble family and dynasty. According to genealogies created in the first half of the 15th century, the family descends via female lineage, through marriage with the Nemanjić dynasty. The family rose to prominence during the fall of the Serbian Empire. The original family domains were centered in the Kosovo region. Later family members extended their rule over all remaining unconquered regions of Serbia making them the last sovereign rulers of medieval Serbian state. The dynasty ruled the Serbian Despotate from 1427 to 1459 and their descendants continue to claim the throne of the Despotate Serbia, some having entered the ranks of the Hungarian aristocracy, while other descendants of the dynasty continue to go by a courtesy title.

Members of the family intermarried with other noble houses from neighbouring countries including Austrian and Hungarian nobility, and provided at least one wife to Ottoman Sultan. By the 17th century, Branković blood had entered into the House of Habsburg, providing more descendants into the ruling houses of Europe. One such descendant was Maria of Yugoslavia, the wife of Alexander I of Yugoslavia. With the ascension of her son Peter II of Yugoslavia in 1934, Branković, Lazarević, and Nemanjić blood returned to the Serbian throne.

Some of the family members were:
Vuk Branković
Đurađ Branković (1427–1456)
Lazar Branković (1456–1458)
Stefan Branković (1458–1459)
Jelena Branković, the last Queen of Bosnia

Family tree

Predecessors

Unknown
Nikola, Serb župan in modern-day Northern Albania
Vojvoda Mladen, ruled Trebinje and Dračevica
Ratislava, daughter of Vojvoda Mladen, married Altoman Vojinović

Brankovići

Branko Mladenović, son of Vojvoda Mladen, ruled Ohrid
Nikola Radonja, the eldest son of Branko Mladenović who governed an estate in Serres region, married Jelena Mrnjavčević and later became a monk on Hilandar
Vuk Branković, Prince of Raška and Kosovo, married Marija Lazarević
 Đurađ Branković, Prince and Despot of Serbia (1427-1456)
Todor (died young)
Grgur Branković, married Jelisaveta N
(illegitimate) Vuk Grgurević, titular Despot of Serbia, married Barbara Frankopan
 Stefan Branković, Despot of Serbia (20 June 1458 - 8 April 1459), exiled from Serbia 1459, a saint of the Serbian Orthodox Church, married Angelina Arianiti
 Đorđe Branković, titular Despot of Serbia, later took monastic vows under the name Maksim, and became Metropolitan of Belgrade and Srem, died in 1516.
(uncertain) Jelisaveta, married Alessio Spani, Lord of Drivasto and Polog
 Jovan Branković, Despot of Serbia, married Jelena Jakšić
Marija, married Ferdinand Frankopan, of the House of Frankopan
Jelena, married Peter IV Rareş, Prince of Moldavia
Ana, married Fiodor Sanguszko, Marshal of Volhynia
Marija Magdalena, married Iwan Wiśniowiecki, a noble from Volhynia
Marija, married Bonifacio III, Mongrave of Montferrat
(uncertain) Milica Despina, married Neagoe Basarab, prince of Wallachia
 Lazar Branković, Despot of Serbia (24 December 1456 - 20 June 1458), married Jelena Palaiologina
Jelena, married  Stjepan Tomašević, King of Bosnia (1461-1463) and Despot of Serbia (1459), 
Jerina, married Gjon Kastrioti II, son of Skanderbeg
Milica, married Leonardo III Tocco, Lord of Epirus
Jelena
Mara, married Murad II, Sultan of the Ottoman Empire
Katarina Branković, married Ulrich II, Count of Celje
Grgur
Lazar
Grgur Branković, Lord of Polog under Vukašin Mrnjavčević
Teodora, married Gjergj Thopia, Prince of Durazzo

References

Sources

External links
House of Brankovic, Marko Pistalo, No 3205, 2013.
Holy line of the Brankovics by Željko Fajfrić

 
Serbian noble families
Serbian royal families